Yayva is an urban locality (an urban-type settlement) in Perm Krai, Russia. Population:

References

Urban-type settlements in Perm Krai
Populated places in Alexandrovsky District